Section 608 (together with Section 609, which covers motor vehicles) of the Clear Air Act (promulgated as 40 CFR Part 82) serves as the main form of occupational licensure for technicians in the HVAC industry in the United States, and satisfies the U.S. requirements under the Montreal Protocol.  It requires that all persons who maintain, service, repair or dispose of appliances that contain regulated refrigerants be certified in proper refrigerant handling techniques.  In particular, it helps regulate and minimize the release of refrigerants, and in particular ozone depleting refrigerants such as chlorofluorocarbons and hydrofluorocarbons, as well as other regulated refrigerants as determined by Section 612.

Scope

There are four categories of certification: 

A technician with the required level of certification may also legally purchase regulated refrigerants.  And technicians who violate the Clean Air Act provisions may be fined, lose their certification, and may be required to appear in Federal court.

Provisions

In general, along with general enforcement provisions, section 608 manages the following regulatory requirements:
 Technician certification
 Refrigerant recovery and recycling techniques and procedures
 Leak checking
 Sales restrictions and venting prohibitions - Listing of chemicals that fall under these requirements is part of the Significant New Alternatives Policy program
 Record keeping requirements
 Disposal and safety
 Reclamation
 Service practices

Recovery level 

For Type I systems the main requirement is to remove 80% of the refrigerant if the appliance's compressor is not running and 90% if running and evacuate to a 4 inch Hg  vacuum.

For Type II or Type III applications, the appliance must be evacuated to the following levels for device manufactured after November 15, 1993 in order to recover the refrigerant

Where pressure classification of the refrigerant is defined by the refrigerant's pressure at 104F as

Recording Requirements 

For systems containing 50 lbs or more of refrigerant, for each service, the owner must be supplied with information of:
 Date of service
 Type of service
 Type of refrigerant purchased
 Quantity of refrigerant added
And such records must be held for 3 years.

Additionally, if an appliance leaks more than 125% of refrigerant, it must be reported to the EPA.

Leak Repair Requirements 

Leaks must be repaired in systems with greater than 50 lbs of refrigerant if the leak rate exceeds

In which case, they must be repaired within 30 days/120 if industrial process shutdown is required.  An initial verification test must then be done within 30/120 days, and then a follow-up test within 10 days of that.  There are additional clauses for extensions if needed.

If the leak is not to be repaired, there must be a plan to retire or retrofit the appliance within 30 days, to be completed within one year.

If more than a year is required, a report must be submitted, which must include:
 Estimated date(s) of completion
 The type of process
 The leak rate
 Method to determine the leak
 Full unit charge
 Date of discovery
 Location of leaks
 Repair work
 Plan for retrofitting or retiring the system
 Why more than one year is necessary
 Date of notification to the EPA

Leak Inspection Regulations 

Additional leak inspection frequencies following a leak must regard the following until the leak rate is within acceptable levels:

These leak inspections may be bypassed if the system is installed with an automatic leak detection system.

Credentialing and Exams

EPA regulations require the test to be a "closed book" proctored exam.  The only outside materials allowed are a temperature / pressure chart, scratch paper and a calculator.  The certification exam contains 4 sections - CORE - Type I - Type II - Type III.  Each section contains 25 multiple choice questions. The technician must achieve a passing score of 70% in each Type in which they are to be certified.  All technicians must pass the CORE section before receiving any certification.  A technician seeking  certification must correctly answer 18 out of 25 questions on the CORE and at least one other section of the exam.   A technician seeking Universal certification must correctly answer 18 out of 25 questions on each section of the exam.

In addition to covering EPA (in particular, Section 608) regulations, the exam also covers basic safety and occupational practices, along with fundamental concepts of stratospheric ozone protection (which are typically part of the CORE exam).

Many universities and colleges also have associate degrees and apprenticeship programs that teach HVAC fundamentals along with providing EPA examinations.

See also
 AHRI - In particular, standard 700 help define levels of refrigerant reclamation, and standard 740 defines standards for recovery equipment
 ASHRAE - In particular, standard 15 helps define refrigerant safety groups
 Clean Air Act - The act that established section 608 certification
 EPA - The central regulatory agency in charge of enforcing section 608
 HVAC Technical Standards Organizations
 Occupational licensure
 Ozone Depletion
 Refrigerant reclamation
 Significant New Alternatives Policy
 Title 40 of the Code of Federal Regulations

References

External links
 CFR section promulgating up-to-date provisions for Section 608
 EPA website regarding Section 608 information

Air pollution in the United States
Code of Federal Regulations
Construction
Environmental law in the United States
Environmental policy in the United States
Heating, ventilation, and air conditioning
Licensing
Recycling by material
Refrigerants
Regulators of biotechnology products
United States Environmental Protection Agency
United States federal environmental legislation